The Seventh Day (第七天 dì qī tiān) is the third Mandarin-language album by Beijing rock band Thin Man. It was released in December 2008 on Fanren Records (凡人唱片).

References

2008 albums
Rock albums by Chinese artists
Thin Man (band) albums